Mark Peter Begich (born March 30, 1962) is an American politician who served as a United States senator from Alaska from 2009 to 2015. A member of the Democratic Party, he previously served as Mayor of Anchorage from 2003 to 2009.

Born in Anchorage, Begich is the son of former U.S. Representative Nick Begich Sr. He was elected to the Anchorage Assembly at the age of 26. He eventually served as chairman for three years, before leaving the Assembly in 1998. Begich ran two unsuccessful campaigns for Mayor of Anchorage in 1994 and 2000 before being elected in 2003. He was subsequently reelected in 2006. In the 2008 Senate election, Begich narrowly defeated incumbent Ted Stevens, at the time the longest-serving Republican member of the U.S. Senate.

In the 2014 Senate election, Begich was narrowly defeated in his bid for reelection by former Alaska Attorney General Dan Sullivan. Following completion of his term in the U.S. Senate, Begich started Anchorage-based consulting firm Northern Compass Group. On June 1, 2018, Begich announced his candidacy for the Democratic nomination for Governor of Alaska in the 2018 election, facing off against Republican nominee and former State Senator Mike Dunleavy. He lost the gubernatorial election by a margin of seven percent.

Early life, education, and early political career
Begich was born and raised in Anchorage, Alaska. He is the son of Margaret Jean "Pegge" (née Jendro) and former U.S. Representative Nick Begich. His father disappeared in October 1972 during a small plane flight from Anchorage to Juneau, Alaska with then U.S. House Majority Leader Hale Boggs, but was reelected the next month, while missing, before both were declared legally dead.

The fourth of six children, he has two sisters and three brothers. His paternal grandparents were Croatian; his paternal grandfather, John Begich, immigrated to the United States from Croatia (then part of the empire of Austria-Hungary) in 1911. His mother had Polish, Bohemian (Czech), Dutch, and English ancestry. He attended Steller Secondary School in Anchorage. As an adolescent, he opened an 18-and-under club called "The Motherlode." At the age of 18, he had obtained a business license to sell jewelry and was helping his mother manage a number of real estate properties. Because of his business opportunities, he decided not to go to college.

His mother twice ran to fill her late husband's Congressional seat in the 1980s, losing to longtime Representative Don Young both times.

At the age of 19, Begich started working in the Anchorage city health department and later worked as a driver for then-Anchorage Mayor Tony Knowles. During the 1988 legislative session, Begich worked as a legislative aide for State Representative Dave Donley.  Begich was elected to the Anchorage Assembly in 1988, at age 26, and served until 1998, including three years as chairman and two as vice chairman.

Begich served for a number of years on the Alaska Commission on Postsecondary Education, including as its chair. In 2001, Governor Tony Knowles appointed Begich to the University of Alaska Board of Regents, but the legislature did not confirm the appointment.

Mayor of Anchorage

He ran unsuccessfully for mayor in 1994 against Rick Mystrom, and in 2000 against then-Assemblyman George Wuerch. In the 2003 mayoral race he narrowly defeated both Mystrom and Wuerch, earning only 11 votes over the number needed to win without a runoff, in accordance with a simultaneously approved law decreasing the threshold needed to avoid such a runoff election from 50 to 45 percent. He was re-elected in April 2006, winning against local advertising and radio personality Jack Frost. Although the office is officially nonpartisan, Begich was the first Democrat to be elected Mayor of the Municipality of Anchorage since Tony Knowles.

Begich was a member of the pro-gun-control group Mayors Against Illegal Guns. Begich left the group in 2007.

U.S. Senate

Elections

2008

On February 27, 2008, Begich announced that he was forming an exploratory committee to run for the United States Senate. After winning the Democratic nomination, he went on to face Republican incumbent Ted Stevens in the general election. Begich was ahead in polls prior to the election. During the campaign, Stevens faced a multiple count indictment on ethics and corruption charges.

On October 27, 2008, eight days before the general election, Stevens was found guilty by a Washington D.C. federal jury on seven felony counts.

Stevens's conviction was later set aside due to prosecutorial misconduct. Attorney General Eric Holder later declined to retry Stevens on the corruption charges.

In April 2009, Alaska Republican Party chairman, Randy Ruedrich, issued a call for Begich to resign so a special election could be held. Despite the fact that the charges had been brought by the Bush administration, Ruedrich argued that Begich's win was illegitimate because of "improper influence from the corrupt Department of Justice." The same day Governor Sarah Palin seconded Ruedrich's call, although she later denied having said Begich should resign. Begich said he intended to serve his full six-year term.

On November 18, 2008, the Associated Press called the election for Begich, who was leading and likely to win by more than the 0.5% margin needed to trigger an automatic recount, with the remainder of uncounted ballots originating from the Anchorage area. Stevens conceded the race the next day.

Begich's victory made him Alaska's first Democratic U.S. Senator since Mike Gravel left office in 1981.

2014

Begich was up for re-election in 2014. He faced William Bryk in the Democratic primary on August 19, 2014, winning 96.7% of the vote. Candidates in the closed Republican primary included Lt. Governor Mead Treadwell, who received 25% of the vote; former Alaska Attorney General and Department of Natural Resources Commissioner Daniel S. Sullivan, who won with 40%; 2010 U.S. Senate nominee Joe Miller (32%); and John Jaramillo (3%). Alaska's 2014 U.S. Senate race was considered one of the most competitive congressional races in the nation, with the Cook Political Report rating it a "toss-up." In the final Rothenberg Political Report before the election, the Report considered the race a "Toss-up/Tilt Republican."

In August 2014, shortly before the Senate primary, Lisa Murkowski, who serves alongside Begich in the U.S. Senate, objected to Begich's use of her image in a campaign advertisement titled "Great Team." Murkowski's law firm sent a cease-and-desist letter, calling the advertisement "factually incorrect." According to Politico, "Begich, running in deep-red Alaska, has sought on several occasions to highlight shared positions with Murkowski. But she is distancing herself." Begich declined to pull the ad.

According to The New York Times, Alaska's 2014 U.S. Senate race is "potentially pivotal" and "nationally watched." The New York Times reported that in a bid to keep his seat, "Begich will try to attract rural voters and supporters of abortion rights." According to The Washington Post, Begich is campaigning on the idea of expanding Social Security benefits. According to The Washington Post, "Begich is one of a small but growing group of Democratic lawmakers who support the idea of lifting or changing the payroll tax cap, so higher earners pay more while adopting a new measure for inflation that would increase benefits for all seniors."

In August 2014, Begich pulled a campaign ad accusing opponent Dan Sullivan of allowing an alleged murderer and rapist to get off with a light sentence. That claim was proven to be false by fact-checkers.  The ad was withdrawn from Alaska television stations following demands from the crime victim's family that the ads were both insensitive and threatened prosecution of a criminal suspect.

Begich voted against a Republican-sponsored amended in the Senate to strip all funding from President Obama's Deferred Action for Childhood Arrivals program and to prevent the DACA program from being expanded. During the campaign, Sullivan criticized Begich's vote.

On November 17, 2014, Begich conceded the election to Sullivan.

Tenure
On February 13, 2009, Begich voted to pass the American Recovery and Reinvestment Act of 2009 (commonly referred to as the Stimulus or The Recovery Act).

In 2012, Begich introduced a bill called the Protecting and Preserving Social Security Act. The bill would have lifted the payroll tax cap, raising taxes on those who earn $110,100 or more per year. It did not pass.

According to an analysis by Congressional Quarterly in 2013 Begich voted with President Obama 97% of the time.

In March 2013, Begich co-sponsored a bill that would flag individuals attempting to buy guns who have used an insanity defense, were ruled dangerous by a court or had been committed by a court to mental health treatment. It did not address the gun show loophole. It has not been passed into law.

Representative Don Young (R–AK) praised Begich for doing a "great job" representing Alaska.

Legislation
Begich sponsored 164 bills of his own, including:

111th Congress (2009–2010)
 S. 1561–1566, Begich's first bills, each introduced on August 3, 2009, would address a number of issues affecting the Arctic region. S. 1561 would increase coordination among the United States, Russia, Canada, Iceland, Norway, Denmark, and other seafaring and Arctic nations with regard to navigation, monitoring of conditions, and marine pollution in Arctic waters. S.1562 would review and make more efficient scientific research being conducted in the Arctic and would direct the National Oceanic and Atmospheric Administration to develop an observation, monitoring, modeling, and research plan for black carbon and other aerosols. S. 1563 would create a U.S. Ambassador At Large for Arctic Affairs. S. 1564 would increase the studying of, preparation for, and responses to oil spills that occur in the Beaufort and Chukchi Seas. S. 1565 would direct the United States Arctic Research Commission to submit biennial reports to Congress detailing the strategies to deal with health needs specific to populations living in the Arctic. S. 1566 would create a grant program in the Department of Agriculture to aid individuals and organizations in the Arctic in adapting to changes in climate and would fund research detailing the most appropriate responses to changes in Arctic climate. Begich later introduced S. 3580 and S.3584, which are similar to S.1564. S.1563, S.1565, S.3580, and S.3584 were reintroduced in the 112th Congress as S. 1229, S. 1227, S. 203 and S. 204. S. 1563 and S. 1565 were reintroduced in the 113th Congress as S. 270 and S. 271.
 S. 1673, a bill to increase the tax deduction for Alaska Native corporations that make donations to conservation on lands reserved for Alaska Natives, introduced September 15, 2009, reintroduced in the 113th Congress as S. 2636
 S. 2842 and S. 2873, bills to deny the tax deduction for direct-to-consumer expenses for prescription pharmaceuticals advertisers, and to allow for a $500 tax credit for the parents of any child who participates in an organization that promotes physical activity for children, introduced December 7 and 11, 2009
 S. 2852, a bill to support the development of renewable energy sources in the Arctic, introduced December 9, 2009, reintroduced in the 112th Congress as S. 3371, and in the 113th Congress as S. 2705
 S. 3225, a bill to create a competitive grant program in the Department of Commerce, with grants to be awarded to entities that promote domestic regional tourism growth and new domestic tourism market creation, was introduced on March 19, 2010. A modified version of this bill was introduced in the 112th Congress as S. 1663.
 S. 3704, a bill to reform the Federal Housing Administration (FHA) in order to improve the financial safety and soundness of the FHA mortgage insurance program, was introduced on August 4, 2010. S. 3704's companion bill was passed by the House of Representatives but has not become law.
 S. 3820, a bill to create a competitive grant program, with grants to be awarded to educational institutions that implement and expand effective science, technology, engineering, and mathematics curricula, introduced September 29, 2010, reintroduced in the 112th Congress as S. 463
 S. 3969 and S. 3971, bills to require genetically-engineered fish to be labeled as such, and to prohibit the commercial approval of genetically-engineered fish, introduced November 18, 2010, reintroduced in the 112th Congress as S. 229 and S. 230

112th Congress (2011–2012)
 S. 205, a bill to require post-production oil drilled from Arctic waters to be transported by means of pipelines, to allocate 37.5% of the revenue generated from leasing rights and post-leasing activities to the Alaskan government, of which 20% is to be allocated to coastal political subdivisions, 33% to certain regional corporations, and 7% to Alaska Native Indian tribes, and to allocate 6.25% of federal royalty revenue to a land and water conservation fund and to reducing the federal government's budget deficit, introduced January 26, 2011, reintroduced in the 113th Congress as S. 199
 S. 895, a bill to create a competitive grant program in the Department of Education to award grants to educational institutions that improve the effectiveness of teachers, strengthen the use of data to improve education, provide rigorous standards with high-standard tests aligned with those standards, turn around the lowest-performing schools, and any other thing the Secretary of Education chooses, with at least 25% of funds being allocated to rural education institutions, and to direct the Secretary of Education to create performance measures to track improvements, introduced May 5, 2011, reintroduced in the 113th Congress as S. 283
 S. 1357, a bill to make the Roadless Area Conservation Rule inapplicable to land in Alaska included in the National Forest System, introduced July 13, 2011, reintroduced in the 113th Congress as S. 384
 S. 1691, a bill to allow the interstate sale of firearms if the transaction is in compliance with both states' laws, and to no longer prohibit licensees from conducting business at gun shows outside of the state in which they received their license, introduced on October 12, 2011
 S. 1717, a bill to prohibit genetically-engineered salmon from being distributed or sold in interstate and foreign commerce, introduced October 17, 2011
 S. 2180 and S. 2181, bills to create a $3,000 tax credit for early-childhood educators, to include early-childhood educators in the federal loan forgiveness programs for teachers, and to cap the allowable amount of loan forgiveness in these programs for early-childhood educators at $25,000, introduced March 8, 2012, reintroduced in the 113th Congress as S. 438 and S. 440
 S. 2188, a bill to allow individuals with a permit to carry concealed handguns to be able to conceal their handguns in all other states in which equivalent laws exist, introduced March 12, 2012
 S. 3262, a bill to authorize aboriginal whaling if it is used for the purpose of subsistence, is accomplished in an efficient manner, and does not include the hunting of any whale accompanied by a calf, introduced July 5, 2012
 S. 3451, a bill to exempt certain air taxi services from an excise tax imposed on air transportation, introduced July 26, 2012

113th Congress (2013–2014)
 S. 282, a bill to award competitive grants to states that implement post-secondary education planning and career guidance programs for students, introduced February 12, 2013
 S. 287, a bill to expand veterans' benefits for homeless veterans, introduced on February 12, 2013
 S. 428, a bill to allow the Army to plan, survey, design, construct, maintain, or operate Arctic deepwater ports in cooperation with developers (which the bill defines), introduced on February 28, 2013
 S. 896, a bill to eliminate the Federal Insurance Contributions Act tax's cap on taxable income, introduced May 8, 2013
 S. 1325, a bill to expand the small business tax credit for health insurance, was introduced on July 18, 2013. A modified version of this bill was later introduced as S. 2069.
 S. 1327, a bill to allow employers to enroll their employees in a health plan in the Federal Employees Health Benefits Program if fewer than two plans are offered in the Small Business Health Options Program and no multi-state plans are available, introduced July 18, 2013
 S. 1729, a bill to create a new "copper" tier of health plans below current "bronze" level plans offered in the PPACA's insurance exchanges, introduced November 19, 2013
 S. 2059, a bill to expand the Nonbusiness Energy Property Tax Credit from a lifetime credit of $1,500 to $5,000 in a single taxable year, introduced February 27, 2014
 S. 2241, a bill to create harsher penalties for individuals who distribute or manufacture drugs in or near schools, recreational areas, swimming pools, and game arcades, introduced April 10, 2014 
 S. 2258, a bill to bind the cost-of-living adjustment (COLA) for veterans' disability compensation to the COLA for disability benefits in the Social Security program, introduced April 28, 2014, signed into law September 26, 2014
 S. 2399, a bill to make valid for voting any ID card issued by an Indian Tribe or Native Corporation, and to place restrictions on the elimination, moving, and consolidation of polling locations in Indian reservations, introduced May 22, 2014
 S. 2957, a bill to prohibit Super PACs from making robocalls to individuals who have listed their phone number in the National Do Not Call Registry, introduced November 25, 2014

Committee assignments

Committee on Appropriations
Subcommittee on Homeland Security
Subcommittee on Interior, Environment, and Related Agencies
Subcommittee on Legislative Branch
Subcommittee on Military Construction, Veterans Affairs, and Related Agencies
Subcommittee on the Department of State, Foreign Operations, and Related Programs
Committee on Commerce, Science and Transportation
Subcommittee on Aviation Operations, Safety, and Security
Subcommittee on Communications, Technology, and the Internet
Subcommittee on Competitiveness, Innovation, and Export Promotion
Subcommittee on Oceans, Atmosphere, Fisheries, and Coast Guard (Chair)
Subcommittee on Surface Transportation and Merchant Marine Infrastructure, Safety, and Security
Committee on Homeland Security and Governmental Affairs
Subcommittee on Financial and Contracting Oversight
Subcommittee on the Efficiency and Effectiveness of Federal Programs and the Federal Workforce
Subcommittee on Emergency Management, Intergovernmental Relations, and the District of Columbia (Chair)
Committee on Indian Affairs
Committee on Veterans' Affairs

Caucus memberships
Senate Oceans Caucus

Political positions

Abortion
Begich is pro-choice and opposes restrictions on late-term abortions. He has received a 100% rating from the pro-choice organization NARAL and a 0% rating from the anti-abortion organization NRLC.

Cannabis
Begich stated that he had concerns but would defend Ballot Measure 2 (Alaska Marijuana Legalization).

Capital punishment
Begich stated that he generally opposes the death penalty.

Domestic security
Begich wants to repeal the Patriot Act and opposes "allowing the government to conduct surveillance wiretaps without warrants."

Energy
In 2008, Begich supported the creation of a national cap-and-trade system for controlling greenhouse gas emissions.  In 2010, he signed a letter advocating the establishment of a 'price' for greenhouse gas emissions as part of national energy policy.  Begich has stated that this should not be interpreted as support for a carbon tax.

Begich supports drilling for oil in the Arctic National Wildlife Refuge.

Environment
Begich believes that human activity is a major factor contributing to climate change.

Gun rights
Begich has a 79% rating with the National Rifle Association.

Healthcare
Begich voted in favor of the Patient Protection and Affordable Care Act (most commonly known as Obamacare) when the bill first passed Congress. Begich has not said whether or not he would vote for the bill again.

Israel
Begich is a supporter of Israel and is part of the advisory committee of the pro-Israel group American Israel Public Affairs Committee.

Labor
Begich supports raising the minimum wage and extending unemployment benefits beyond 26 weeks.

Same-sex marriage
Begich supports same-sex marriage.

Veterans' affairs
On April 28, 2014, Begich introduced the Veterans' Compensation Cost-of-Living Adjustment Act of 2014 (S. 2258; 113th Congress), a bill that would, beginning on December 1, 2014, increase the rates of veterans' disability compensation, additional compensation for dependents, the clothing allowance for certain disabled veterans, and dependency and indemnity compensation for surviving spouses and children.

Personal life
Begich is married to Deborah Bonito, a former chair of the Alaska Democratic Party and the owner of several small businesses throughout Anchorage. They have a son, Jacob. Begich is a Roman Catholic.

During his term in the Senate, Begich was the only U.S. Senator without a college degree. He has taken continuing education classes at the University of Alaska Anchorage. His brother Nick Jr. has researched and written about the High-frequency Active Auroral Research Program (HAARP) program as an instrument of weather modification and possibly mind control. His nephew, Nick III, made the primary runoff (along with ex-Governor Sarah Palin and ex-state Representative Mary Sattler Peltola) for the Congressional seat that became vacant in 2022 as a result of the death of Don Young. Mark's brother Tom was elected as a state senator from Anchorage but declined to file for reelection in 2022.

Electoral history

Anchorage Assembly

Anchorage Mayor

U.S. Senate

Alaska Governor

References

Further reading

External links

 

|-

|-

|-

|-

|-

 
1962 births
Living people
20th-century American politicians
20th-century Roman Catholics
21st-century American politicians
21st-century Roman Catholics
Alaska Democrats
American Christian Zionists
American people of Bohemian descent
American people of Croatian descent
American people of Czech descent
American people of Dutch descent
American people of English descent
American people of Polish descent
Catholic politicians from Alaska
Anchorage Assembly members
Businesspeople from Alaska
Democratic Party United States senators from Alaska
Mayors of Anchorage, Alaska
University of Alaska Anchorage alumni
University of Alaska regents
Candidates in the 2018 United States elections
Begich family
Politicians from Anchorage, Alaska